97 (BRITFOR) Signal Squadron (Volunteers) is a Territorial Army squadron in the Royal Corps of Signals in the British Army. The squadron comprises personnel from other TA signals units who have volunteered for an operational tour in support of British Army peacekeeping operations (BRITFOR) in the Balkans under EUFOR Althea and KFOR.

The original deployment was in the winter of 2001, and was the first major deployment overseas of a Territorial Army unit overseas since the second world war.

External links 
 97 (BRITFOR) Signal Squadron (Volunteers) - official

Army Reserve (United Kingdom)
Squadrons of the Royal Corps of Signals